Harpalus araraticus is a species of ground beetle in the subfamily Harpalinae. It was described by Mylnar in 1979.

References

araraticus
Beetles described in 1979